James B. Leong (born Leong But-jung and sometimes credited as Jimmy Leong) was a Chinese-American character actor and filmmaker who had a long career in Hollywood beginning during the silent era.

Leong was born in Shanghai, and he moved to the United States with his parents when he was young. He graduated from college in Muncie, Indiana, in 1915 and briefly worked at a newspaper before moving to Hollywood, where he worked at first as a technical director for filmmakers like D. W. Griffith and Wesley Ruggles.

By 1919, he had started his own production company — James B. Leong Productions, later known as the Wah Ming Motion Picture Company — to show Chinese life as it really was. He had grown tired of seeing Chinese people portrayed as kidnappers and assassins on the screen. Under this banner, he wrote and directed the 1921 film Lotus Blossom. During that time, he had said he planned to write and direct four films a year, though it never to fruition, with a planned follow-up, The Unbroken Promise, never filmed.

He took work as an actor, playing  smaller roles in Hollywood films, as well as continuing to work as a technical director and dialect coach. He made money by growing of silk crops in the 1940s.

He married Agatha Tarwater in 1934; the pair had a son together. Leong became a U.S. citizen in 1958.

Selected filmography 
As writer-director

 Lotus Blossom (1921)

As producer

 China Speaks (1937)

As actor

 The Purple Dawn (1923)
 Defying the Law (1924)
 The Devil Dancer (1927)
 China Slaver (1929)
 Shanghai Lady (1929)
 Lotus Lady (1930)
 Chinatown After Dark (1931)
 Shanghai Express (1932)
 The Hatchet Man (1932)
 The Heart Punch (1932)
 The Mask of Fu Manchu (1932)
 Son of Kong (1933)
 The Hell Cat (1934)
 The Cat's-Paw (1934)
 The Mysterious Mr. Wong (1934)
 Chinatown Squad (1935)
 Shadows of the Orient (1935)
 Captured in Chinatown (1935)
 East of Java (1935)
 Shadow of Chinatown (1936)
 The Good Earth (1937)
 West of Shanghai (1937)
 Thank You, Mr. Moto (1937)
 Mr. Moto Takes a Chance (1938)
 North of Shanghai (1939)
 Daughter of the Tong (1939)
 Drums of Fu Manchu (1940)
 South of Pago Pago (1940)
 They Met in Bombay (1941)
 Lady from Chungking (1942)
 A Yank on the Burma Road (1942)
 Behind the Rising Sun (1943)
 Headin' for God's Country (1943)
 Dragon Seed (1944)
 The Keys of the Kingdom (1944)
 Shadows Over Chinatown (1946)
 Green Dolphin Street (1947)
 Her Husband's Affairs (1947)
 I Was an American Spy (1951)
 The Shanghai Story (1954)
 Rio Bravo (1959)
 The Mountain Road (1960)

References

External links

Chinese film directors
1889 births
1967 deaths
Indiana State University alumni
Chinese male film actors
Chinese emigrants to the United States